William Joyce (born December 29, 1957) is a Canadian retired ice hockey right wing who was the NCAA Scoring Champion in 1979–80.

Career
Joyce was a member of the inaugural recruiting class for Northern Michigan University when the ice hockey team was promoted to varsity status. He finished second on the team in scoring as a freshman and helped the team to a winning record in their first season. The program joined the CCHA beginning in 1977 and the team was good enough to finish in the top half of the conference. Joyce continued to finish second in team scoring behind Mike Mielke in each of this first three seasons. As a senior, Joyce's scoring exploded and he led the nation with 96 points, besting his previous record by nearly 40 points. Joyce led the Wildcats to a first place finish in the CCHA as well as the program's first conference championship and NCAA tournament appearance. Unfortunately, because the CCHA was still seen as a lesser conference, Joyce was not named an All-American (no players for the CCHA received that honor in 1980). Northern Michigan surprised many in college hockey by winning their first two tournament games to make the 1980 championship game. Joyce scored the first goal for the Wildcats in the title tilt but it came after they were already behind 0–4 and didn't change the final outcome.

After graduating, Joyce began his professional career with a short appearance in 1981 before finding a home with the Toledo Goaldiggers in 1982. He finished second on the team with 112 points and helped the club win both the regular season title and the Turner Cup. Joyce remained with the team for another two and half years, helping them to a second championship in 1983, and finished his career out with the Flint Generals in 1985.

Joyce was inducted into the Northern Michigan Athletic Hall of Fame in 1998 and remains the team's All-Time leading scorer as of 2021. When the CCHA ceased operations after the 2013 season, Joyce was named to the All-Time CCHA Second Team, the only Wildcat to make an appearance.

Career statistics

Regular season and playoffs

Awards and honors

References

External links

1957 births
Living people
Canadian ice hockey centres
Ice hockey people from Ontario
Sportspeople from Mississauga
St. Catharines Black Hawks players
Northern Michigan Wildcats men's ice hockey players
Milwaukee Admirals players
Richmond Rifles players
Toledo Goaldiggers players
Flint Generals (IHL) players
AHCA Division I men's ice hockey All-Americans